Camp Cucamonga (also titled: How I Spent My Summer and Lights Out) is a made-for-television movie that first aired on NBC on September 23, 1990.

The family film served primarily as a vehicle to cast a variety of stars from popular TV series of the era, including John Ratzenberger (Cheers), Brian Robbins (Head of the Class), Chad Allen (My Two Dads), Candace Cameron (Full House), Josh Saviano and Danica McKellar (both of The Wonder Years), Jaleel White (Family Matters), Dorothy Lyman (Mama's Family) and Sherman Hemsley (Amen). The film is also notable for including an early starring role for Jennifer Aniston before she became well known, as well as a supporting role for Breckin Meyer and the comedy acting debut of G. Gordon Liddy.

Overview
The movie starts with several teens on a bus, which is when the whole gang meet each other. Jennifer (Tasha Scott) is seeing what is happening in her life when she meets Dennis (Jaleel White), and  the two fall head over heels in love. Meanwhile, Frankie (Chad Allen) and Amber (Candace Cameron Bure) talk about how they are older as boyfriend and girlfriend and now can hang out more often. Lindsey (Danica McKellar) interrupts the couple, telling them to be quiet since the whole bus is not interested. Amber ultimately fires back telling to her to mind her own business. Cody (Breckin Meyer) spills soda on Max Plotkin (Josh Saviano), but Lindsey sticks up for Max by tripping Cody on his skateboard. Because of this Max falls head over heals in love with her. Then a biker, Roger (Brian Robbins) flirts with Ava (Jennifer Aniston). The two end up having an apples to oranges relationship. Now that the gang has all met each other the members are Camp Hunk Frankie, Camp Queen Bee Amber, Camp Rebel Lindsey, Camp Klutz a.k.a. Nerd Max, Camp Hip Dennis and Camp Rapper Jennifer.

The kids arrive at Camp Cucamonga, where they meet head counselor Marvin (John Ratzenberger). He announces that they are going to have a "Battle of the Bunks". When the girls are going to take showers, Amber makes fun of Lindsey by telling if she takes a shower, it will spoil her image. Because of this Lindsey leaves and goes to her bunk. Then all the kids get ready for the cook off and are suddenly missing and are found by the camp crew. The camp starts to get bad critics. The gang decides to make a rap video. The video becomes a hit, and the camp is visited by a special guest (G. Gordon Liddy). When the Battle of the Bunks begins, Lindsey manages to win all the female activities, while Frankie is overwhelmed begins to hang out with Lindsey more often, causing Amber to grow jealous as a result.

The girls then get letters from their parents. Amber takes away Lindsey's letters and reveals that they are fake. Amber reads the letter and reveals that Lindsey's parents are filing for divorce; sad and ashamed, she then runs away, but the rest of the gang finds here. Now the time comes for the baseball tournament, where Lindsey hopes Max will hit home run. Frankie sees her shaking and holds her hand, causing Amber to get even more jealous. Max ends up hitting a home run and wins.

At the subsequent Victory Dance, Amber sees Frankie and Lindsey together and pulls Frankie aside. Max tells Lindsey that they should see other people and can go steady when they are ready. Amber and Frankie then break up because Frankie cares more about Lindsey then he cares about her. Frankie asks Lindsey to dance with him, and the two are officially a couple. Amber offers Max fruit punch, and they become a couple also. Max ends up winning the scholar athlete award, while Roger and Ava are also now official.

Camp Cucamonga was released on VHS in 1992 and on DVD in 2004.

Cast
 John Ratzenberger as Marvin Schector
 Brian Robbins as Roger Burke
 Jennifer Aniston as Ava Schector
 Chad Allen as Frankie Calloway
 Candace Cameron as Amber Lewis
 Danica McKellar as Lindsey Scott
 Josh Saviano as Max Plotkin
 Tasha Scott as Jennifer
 Jaleel White as Dennis Brooks
 Dorothy Lyman as Millie Schector
 Richard Herd as Thornton Bradley
 G. Gordon Liddy as Howard Sloan
 Sherman Hemsley as Herbert Himmel
 Lauren Tewes as Mrs Scott
 Breckin Meyer as Cody
 John Snee as Troy
 Patrick Thomas O'Brien as Virgil
 Kari Whitman as Patty
 Melanie Shatner as Wendy
 Dion Zamora as Chuck
 Rachel Verduzco as Tita 
 Kate Finlayson as Wrangler 
 Misty McCoy as Courtney Parker
 Risa Schiffman as Louise Bradley

References

External links

Camp Cucamonga at MTV.com
Camp Cucamonga at Hollywood.com

1990s English-language films
1990s teen comedy films
1990 television films
1990 films
Films about summer camps
NBC network original films
NBC Productions films